The End is Near is a 2012 Nollywood drama film directed by Ugezu J. Ugezu and written by Cajetan Obi.

Cast
Esther Audu 
Patience Ozokwor
Chika Ike
Solomon Akiyesi
Yul Edochie
Chacha Eke
Vitalis Ndubuisi

References

External links

English-language Nigerian films
Nigerian drama films
2012 films
2010s English-language films